San Tun is a Burmese politician and former military officer. He is an incumbent member of the Amyotha Hluttaw. He previously served as a Northern Deputy Regional Commander for the Myanmar Army.

San Tun was born on 2 March 1951 in Rangoon, Burma. He is married to Tin Sein.

San Tun contested the 2010 Burmese general election as a Union Solidarity and Development Party candidate for the Amyotha Hluttaw, representing the Thazi Township constituency No. 2. He won the election with 34,092 votes, about 68% of the votes.

References

1951 births
Burmese military personnel
Burmese politicians
Living people
People from Yangon
Union Solidarity and Development Party politicians